Kadwaya is a village in Madhya Pradesh, India. It is located in the Isagarh Tehsil in the Ashoknagar district. The village has a number of temples. The population in 2011 was 4,572.

References

Villages in Ashoknagar district